Per Filip Billy Eriksson (born 1949 in Sölvesborg, Sweden) is a Swedish scientist and professor in signal processing. He served as rector of Lund University from 2009 to 2014, as rector of Blekinge Institute of Technology from 1989 to 2000 and director-general at Vinnova from 2001 to 2008. His membership in the Baptist Hyllie Park Church was once the subject of a heated controversy regarding his appointment as rector of Lund University.

References 

Swedish Baptists
Swedish engineers
Academic staff of Lund University
Rectors of Lund University
Members of the Royal Swedish Academy of Engineering Sciences
1949 births
Living people
21st-century Swedish engineers
20th-century Swedish engineers
Controversies in Sweden